The 1988 Big Eight men's basketball tournament was held March 10–12 at Kemper Arena in Kansas City, Missouri.

Top-seeded Oklahoma defeated #2 seed Kansas State in the championship game, 88–83, to earn the conference's automatic bid to the 1988 NCAA tournament.

Bracket

References

Tournament
Big Eight Conference men's basketball tournament
Big Eight Conference men's basketball tournament
Big Eight Conference men's basketball tournament